This is a list of 206 species in Stenopogon, a genus of robber flies in the family Asilidae.

Stenopogon species

 Stenopogon abdulrassuli Lehr, 1984 c g
 Stenopogon adelantae Wilcox, 1971 i c g
 Stenopogon aeacidinus Williston, 1886 c g
 Stenopogon aeacus (Wiedemann, 1828) c g
 Stenopogon alamoensis (Martin, 1968) c g
 Stenopogon albalulus Martin, 1968 c g
 Stenopogon albibasis Bigot, 1878 i c g
 Stenopogon albociliatus Hermann, 1929 c g
 Stenopogon ambryon (Walker, 1849) c g
 Stenopogon antigenes (Walker, 1849) c g
 Stenopogon antoniae Wilcox, 1971 i c g
 Stenopogon aphrices (Walker, 1849) c g
 Stenopogon arabicus (Macquart, 1838) c
 Stenopogon arizonensis Bromley, 1937 c g
 Stenopogon armatus Oldroyd, 1974 c g
 Stenopogon arnaudi Martin, 1968 c g
 Stenopogon atrox Oldroyd, 1974 c g
 Stenopogon avus (Loew, 1874) c g
 Stenopogon bakeri Wilcox, 1971 i c g
 Stenopogon bartonae Wilcox, 1971 i c g
 Stenopogon blaisdelli Wilcox, 1971 i c g
 Stenopogon boharti Bromley, 1951 i c g
 Stenopogon braunsi Oldroyd, 1974 c g
 Stenopogon brevipennis (Wiedemann, 1820) c
 Stenopogon brevis Martin, 1968 c g
 Stenopogon breviusculoides Bromley, 1937 i c g b
 Stenopogon breviusculus Loew, 1872 i c g b
 Stenopogon bromleyi Wilcox, 1971 i c g
 Stenopogon brookmani Wilcox, 1971 i c g
 Stenopogon californiae (Walker, 1849) i c g b
 Stenopogon californioides Bromley, 1937 i c g
 Stenopogon callosus (Pallas, 1818) c g
 Stenopogon carbonarius Hermann, 1929 c g
 Stenopogon cazieri Brookman, 1941 i c g b
 Stenopogon cervinus Loew, 1861 c g
 Stenopogon cinchonaensis Joseph & Parui, 1981 c g
 Stenopogon cinereus Engel, 1940 c g
 Stenopogon colimae Martin, 1968 c g
 Stenopogon confrontus Oldroyd, 1974 c g
 Stenopogon coracinus (Loew, 1847) c g
 Stenopogon costatus Loew, 1871 c g
 Stenopogon cressius Tomasovic, 2005 c g
 Stenopogon csikii Strobl, 1901 c g
 Stenopogon damias (Walker, 1849) c g
 Stenopogon diablae Wilcox, 1971 i c g
 Stenopogon dilutus (Walker, 1851) c g
 Stenopogon diversus (Williston, 1901) c g
 Stenopogon dorothyae Martin, 1968 c g
 Stenopogon duncani Bromley, 1937 c g
 Stenopogon ebyi Bromley, 1937 c g
 Stenopogon echelus (Walker, 1849) c g
 Stenopogon elizabethae Martin, 1968 c g
 Stenopogon elongatissimus Efflatoun, 1937 c g
 Stenopogon elongatus (Meigen, 1804) c g
 Stenopogon engelhardti Bromley, 1937 i c g b
 Stenopogon englandi Wilcox, 1971 i c g
 Stenopogon escalarae Strobl, 1906 c g
 Stenopogon escorialensis Strobl, 1906 c g
 Stenopogon evansi (Martin, 1968) c g
 Stenopogon felis Bromley, 1931 i c g
 Stenopogon festae Bezzi, 1925 c g
 Stenopogon figueroae Wilcox, 1971 i c g
 Stenopogon flavibarbis Enderlein, 1934 c g
 Stenopogon flavotibialis Martin, 1968 c g
 Stenopogon fulvus (Meigen, 1838) c g
 Stenopogon fuscolimbatus Bigot, 1878 c g
 Stenopogon galadae Martin, 1968 c g
 Stenopogon galbinus Martin, 1968 c g
 Stenopogon gracilis (Macquart, 1838) c
 Stenopogon gratus Loew, 1872 i c g
 Stenopogon gruenbergi Becker, 1911 c g
 Stenopogon hamus Martin, 1968 c g
 Stenopogon harpax Loew, 1868 c g
 Stenopogon heteroneurus (Macquart, 1838) c
 Stenopogon hiemalis Martin, 1968 c g
 Stenopogon hradskyi Lehr, 1963 c g
 Stenopogon imbrex (Walker, 1849) c g
 Stenopogon indistinctus Bromley, 1937 c g
 Stenopogon inermipes Strobl, 1909 c g
 Stenopogon inquinatus Loew, 1866 i c g b
 Stenopogon inyae Wilcox, 1971 i c g
 Stenopogon iphippus Seguy, 1932 c g
 Stenopogon iphis Seguy, 1932 c g
 Stenopogon ischyrus Seguy, 1932 c g
 Stenopogon jubatoides Bromley, 1937 i c g
 Stenopogon jubatus (Coquillett, 1904) i c g
 Stenopogon junceus (Wiedemann, 1820) c g
 Stenopogon jurupae Wilcox, 1971 i c g
 Stenopogon kaltenbachi Engel, 1929 c g
 Stenopogon kherai Joseph & Parui, 1976 c g
 Stenopogon kirkwoodi Wilcox, 1971 i c g
 Stenopogon kocheri Timon-David, 1951 c g
 Stenopogon kolenati (Gimmerthal, 1847) c g
 Stenopogon koreanus Young, 2005 c g
 Stenopogon kozlovi Lehr, 1963 c g
 Stenopogon laevigatus (Loew, 1851) c g
 Stenopogon languidus Hradsky, 1962 c g
 Stenopogon latipennis Loew, 1866 c g
 Stenopogon lehri Londt, 1999 c g
 Stenopogon linsleyi Wilcox, 1971 i c g
 Stenopogon loewi Joseph & Parui, 1984 c g
 Stenopogon lomae Wilcox, 1971 i c g b
 Stenopogon longulus Loew, 1866 c g
 Stenopogon lugubris (Williston, 1901) c g
 Stenopogon macilentus Loew, 1861 c g
 Stenopogon macswaini Wilcox, 1971 i c g
 Stenopogon manii Joseph & Parui, 1981 c g
 Stenopogon manipurensis Joseph & Parui, 1976 c g
 Stenopogon marikovskii Lehr, 1963 c g
 Stenopogon martini Bromley, 1937 i c g
 Stenopogon mediterraneus Lehr, 1963 c g
 Stenopogon melanderi Wilcox, 1971 i c g
 Stenopogon melanostolus Loew, 1868 c g
 Stenopogon milvoides Engel, 1929 c g
 Stenopogon milvus (Loew, 1847) c g
 Stenopogon minos (Osten Sacken, 1887) c g
 Stenopogon mojavae Wilcox, 1971 i c g
 Stenopogon mollis Loew, 1868 c g
 Stenopogon mongolicus Lehr, 1963 c g
 Stenopogon mydon Engel, 1930 c g
 Stenopogon mysorensis Joseph & Parui, 1981 c g
 Stenopogon nataliae Richter, 1963 c g
 Stenopogon nathani Joseph & Parui, 1976 c g
 Stenopogon neojubatus Wilcox and Martin, 1945 i c g
 Stenopogon nigripes Engel, 1940 c g
 Stenopogon nigritulus Coquillett, 1904 i c g
 Stenopogon nigriventris Loew, 1868 c g
 Stenopogon nigrofasciatus Brunetti, 1928 c g
 Stenopogon nigrolimbatus Martin, 1968 c g
 Stenopogon nitens Coquillett, 1904 c g
 Stenopogon oaxacensis Martin, 1968 c g
 Stenopogon obispae Wilcox, 1971 i c g b
 Stenopogon obliteratus Richter, 1963 c g
 Stenopogon obscuriventris Loew, 1872 i c g
 Stenopogon occidentalis Lehr, 1963 c g
 Stenopogon occlusus Theodor, 1980 c g
 Stenopogon ochraceus (Wulp, 1870) c g
 Stenopogon ochripes Loew, 1861 c g
 Stenopogon oldroydi Joseph & Parui, 1976 c g
 Stenopogon orientalis Lehr, 1963 c g
 Stenopogon ortegai Martin, 1968 c g
 Stenopogon ozenae Wilcox, 1971 i c g
 Stenopogon painterorum (Martin, 1968) c g
 Stenopogon parksi Bromley, 1934 c g
 Stenopogon peregrinus Seguy, 1932 c g
 Stenopogon petilus Martin, 1968 c g
 Stenopogon piceus (von Roder, 1893) c g
 Stenopogon pinyonae Wilcox, 1971 i c g
 Stenopogon porcus Loew, 1871 c g
 Stenopogon povolnyi Hradsky, 1985 c g
 Stenopogon powelli Wilcox, 1971 i c g
 Stenopogon pradhani Joseph & Parui, 1976 c g
 Stenopogon propinquus Bromley, 1937 i c g
 Stenopogon pseudosabaudus Lehr, 1963 c g
 Stenopogon pulverifer (Walker, 1851) c g
 Stenopogon pumilus Coquillett, 1904 c g
 Stenopogon pyrrhomus (Wiedemann, 1818) c g
 Stenopogon pyrrhus Loew, 1871 c g
 Stenopogon rafaelae Wilcox, 1971 i c g
 Stenopogon raven (Bromley, 1938) c g
 Stenopogon rhadamanthus Loew, 1866 c g
 Stenopogon rionegrensis Lamas, 1971 c g
 Stenopogon roederii Bezzi, 1895 c g
 Stenopogon roonwali Joseph & Parui, 1993 c g
 Stenopogon rossi Martin, 1968 c g
 Stenopogon rufescens Theodor, 1980 c g
 Stenopogon rufibarbis Bromley, 1931 i c g b
 Stenopogon rufibarboides Bromley, 1937 i c g
 Stenopogon ruficauda Engel, 1929 c g
 Stenopogon sabaudus (Fabricius, 1794) c g
 Stenopogon schisticolor Gerstaecker, 1861 c g
 Stenopogon sciron (Loew, 1873) c g
 Stenopogon setosus Bezark, 1984 c g
 Stenopogon silaceus Martin, 1968 c g
 Stenopogon sinaloensis (Martin, 1968) c g
 Stenopogon solsolacearum Lehr, 1963 c g
 Stenopogon stackelbergi Lehr, 1963 c g
 Stenopogon stonei Bromley, 1937 c g
 Stenopogon strataegus Gerstaecker, 1861 c g
 Stenopogon subtus (Bromley, 1935) c g
 Stenopogon superbus (Portschinsky, 1873) c g
 Stenopogon surufus Martin, 1968 c g
 Stenopogon taboarde Strobl, 1909 c g
 Stenopogon tenebrosus Coquillett, 1904 c g
 Stenopogon tequilae (Martin, 1968) c g
 Stenopogon texanus Bromley, 1931 c g
 Stenopogon theodori Lehr, 1984 c g
 Stenopogon tolandi Wilcox, 1971 i c g
 Stenopogon tristis (Meigen, 1820) c g
 Stenopogon trivialis Oldroyd, 1974 c g
 Stenopogon truquii (Bellardi, 1861) c g
 Stenopogon utahensis Bromley, 1951 i c g
 Stenopogon vallensis Martin, 1968 c g
 Stenopogon variabilis Theodor, 1980 c g
 Stenopogon villus Martin, 1968 c g
 Stenopogon werneri Engel, 1933 c g
 Stenopogon wilcoxi Bromley, 1937 i c g
 Stenopogon williamsi Wilcox, 1971 i c g
 Stenopogon wolfi Mik, 1887 c g
 Stenopogon xanthomelas Loew, 1868 c g
 Stenopogon xanthotrichus (Brulle, 1833) c g
 Stenopogon xochimilcae Martin, 1968 c g
 Stenopogon youngi (Martin, 1968) c g
 Stenopogon zebra Martin, 1968 c g
 Stenopogon zimini Lehr, 1963 c g
 Stenopogon zinovievi Lehr, 1963 c g

Data sources: i = ITIS, c = Catalogue of Life, g = GBIF, b = Bugguide.net

References

Stenopogon
Articles created by Qbugbot